The 1976–77 2. Bundesliga season was the third season of the 2. Bundesliga, the second tier of the German football league system. It was played in two regional divisions, Nord and Süd.

FC St. Pauli, VfB Stuttgart and TSV 1860 Munich were promoted to the Bundesliga while Bonner SC, Göttingen 05, Wacker 04 Berlin, VfL Wolfsburg, Röchling Völklingen, Jahn Regensburg and BSV Schwenningen were relegated to the Oberligas and Amateurligas.

Nord 
For the 1976–77 season saw Arminia Hannover, Bonner SC, SC Herford and VfL Wolfsburg promoted to the 2. Bundesliga from the Oberliga and Amateurligas while Bayer 05 Uerdingen and Hannover 96 had been relegated to the 2. Bundesliga Nord from the Bundesliga.

League table

Results

Top scorers 
The league's top scorers:

Süd
For the 1976–77 season saw BSV Schwenningen, Eintracht Trier, FV Würzburg 04 and KSV Baunatal promoted to the 2. Bundesliga from the Amateurligas and Kickers Offenbach relegated to the 2. Bundesliga Süd from the Bundesliga.

League table

Results

Top scorers 
The league's top scorers:

Promotion play-offs
The final place in the Bundesliga was contested between the two runners-up in the Nord and Süd divisions. TSV 1860 Munich were promoted to the Bundesliga after a third game was made necessary to decide the series.

References

External links
 2. Bundesliga 1976/1977 Nord at Weltfussball.de 
 2. Bundesliga 1976/1977 Süd at Weltfussball.de 
 1976–77 2. Bundesliga at kicker.de 

2
German
2. Bundesliga seasons